The Welsh Division, Royal Artillery, was an administrative grouping of garrison units of the Royal Artillery, Artillery Militia and Artillery Volunteers in the British Army's Western District from 1882 to 1889.

Organisation
Under General Order 72 of 4 April 1882 the Royal Artillery (RA) broke up its existing administrative brigades of garrison artillery (7th–11th Brigades, RA) and assigned the individual batteries to 11 new territorial divisions. These divisions were purely administrative and recruiting organisations, not field formations. Most were formed within the existing military districts into which the United Kingdom was divided, and for the first time associated the part-time Artillery Militia with the regulars. Shortly afterwards the Artillery Volunteers were also added to the territorial divisions. The Regular Army batteries were grouped into one brigade, usually of nine sequentially-numbered batteries and a depot battery. For t these units the divisions represented recruiting districts – batteries could be serving anywhere in the British Empire and their only connection to brigade headquarters (HQ) was for the supply of drafts and recruits. The artillery militia units (sometimes referred to as regiments) already comprised a number of batteries, and were redesignated as brigades, losing their county titles in the process. The artillery volunteers, which had previously consisted of numerous independent Artillery Volunteer Corps (AVC) of various sizes, sometimes grouped into administrative brigades, had been consolidated into larger AVCs in 1881, which were now affiliated to the appropriate territorial division.

Composition
Welsh Division, RA, listed as ninth in order of precedence, was organised in Western District with the following composition:

 Headquarters (HQ) at Pembroke Dock
1st Brigade
 HQ at Newport
 1st Bty at Pembroke Dock – formerly 9th Bty, 8th Bde
 2nd Bty at Hubberston – formerly 12nd Bty, 9th Bde
 3rd Bty at Pembroke Dock – formerly 19th Bty, 11th Bde
 4th Bty at Secunderabad – formerly 4th Bty, 8th Bde
 5th Bty at St Thomas's Mount – formerly 7th Bty, 8th Bde
 6th Bty at Halifax, Nova Scotia – formerly 2nd Bty, 10th Bde
 7th Bty at Halifax – formerly 17th Bty, 9th Bde
 8th Bty at Halifax – formerly 18th Bty, 9th Bde
 9th Bty – new Bty formed 1885
 Depot Bty at Newport – formerly Depot Bty, 11th Bde
 2nd Brigade at Swansea – formerly Royal Glamorgan Artillery Militia (4 btys)
 3rd Brigade at Carmarthen – formerly Royal Carmarthen Artillery Militia (6 btys)
 4th Brigade at Haverfordwest – formerly Royal Pembroke Artillery Militia (5 btys)
 5th Brigade at Aberystwyth – formerly Royal Cardigan Artillery Militia (4 btys)
 1st Glamorganshire Artillery Volunteers at Cardiff
 1st Gloucestershire Artillery Volunteers at Bristol
 1st Pembrokeshire Artillery Volunteers at Pembroke Dock
 1st Worcestershire Artillery Volunteers at Worcester

Disbandment
On 1 July 1889 the garrison artillery was reorganised again into three large territorial divisions of garrison artillery (Eastern, Southern and Western) and one of mountain artillery. The assignment of units to them seemed geographically arbitrary, with the Welsh units being divided between the Southern and Western Divisions. The regular batteries were distributed across most of the divisions and completely renumbered.

See also
 Royal Garrison Artillery
 List of Royal Artillery Divisions 1882–1902
 Eastern Division, Royal Artillery
 Southern Division, Royal Artillery
 Western Division, Royal Artillery

Footnotes

Notes

References
 J.B.M. Frederick, Lineage Book of British Land Forces 1660–1978, Vol II, Wakefield: Microform Academic, 1984, ISBN 1-85117-009-X.
 Lt-Gen H.G. Hart, The New Annual Army List, Militia List, Yeomanry Cavalry List and Indian Civil Service List for 1884, London: John Murray, 1883.
 Lt-Gen H.G. Hart, The New Annual Army List, Militia List, Yeomanry Cavalry List and Indian Civil Service List for 1890, London: John Murray, 1889.
 Lt-Col M.E.S. Lawes, Battery Records of the Royal Artillery, 1859–1877, Woolwich: Royal Artillery Institution, 1970.
 Norman E.H. Litchfield, The Militia Artillery 1852–1909 (Their Lineage, Uniforms and Badges), Nottingham: Sherwood Press, 1987, ISBN 0-9508205-1-2.
 Norman Litchfield & Ray Westlake, The Volunteer Artillery 1859–1908 (Their Lineage, Uniforms and Badges), Nottingham: Sherwood Press, 1982, ISBN 0-9508205-0-4.
 Col K. W. Maurice-Jones, The History of Coast Artillery in the British Army, London: Royal Artillery Institution, 1959/Uckfield: Naval & Military Press, 2005, ISBN 978-1-845740-31-3.
 War Office, Monthly Army List, London: HM Stationery Office, 1882–89.

Royal Artillery divisions
Military units and formations in Wales
Military units and formations established in 1882
Military units and formations disestablished in 1889